is a Japanese actress and idol.

Career
Uchiyama was first discovered in her hometown in Kanagawa Prefecture by the talent agency Sweet Power at the age of 15. She was signed up by the agency, and in 1998, moved to Tokyo to launch her career in the entertainment industry.

Personal life 
On November 21, 2021, Uchiyama announced that she is married to actor Eisaku Yoshida.

Filmography

Film
 Utukushii Hito (1999)
 Go-Con! Japanese Love Culture (2000) as Jun
 Satorare (2001)
 Sotsugyo (2002)
 Shinku (The Deep Red) (2005) as Kanako Akiba
 Nobuhiro-san (2005)
 Tooku no Sora (2010) as Mie Matsuki
 Kyoryu o horo! (2013) as Sachiko Matsumoto
 Kakekomi (2015)
 Yurari (2017)
 Mirai eno Katachi (2021)

Television
 Nanisama (TBS, 1998) as Mizuki
 Suzuran (NHK, 1999)
 LxIxVxE (TBS, 1999) as Matsubara Chieas
 Utsukushii hito (TBS, 1999)
 Bus Stop (Fuji TV, 2000) as Miyamae Matsuri
 Hensyuo (Fuji TV, 2000)
 Strawberry on the Shortcake (SOS) (TBS, 2001) as Sawamura Haruka
 Rookie! (Fuji TV, 2001) as Sato Kaori
 Handoku (TBS, 2001) as Kojima Michiko
 Yonimo Kimyona Monogatari (Mushi game) (Fuji TV, 2002)
 Wedding Planner (Fuji TV, 2002, ep4) as Fujinami Chizuru
 Good Luck!! (TBS, 2003) as Fukaura Urara
 Moto Kare (TBS, 2003) as Hayakawa Nao
 Musashi (NHK, 2003) as Akemi
 Higuchi Ichiyo Monogatari (TBS, 2004) as Higuchi Ichiyo
 Fire Boys (Fuji TV, 2004) as Sonoda Mahiru
 Koi no Kara Sawagi Drama Special (Love Stories) (NTV, 2004)
 Hoshino Senichi Monogatari (TBS, 2005)
 Rikon Bengoshi 2 (Fuji TV, 2005, ep1)
 Oku: Hana no Ran (Fuji TV, 2005) as Yasuko
 Earthquake (NTV, 2006)
 Message (MBS, 2006)
 Bokutachi no Senso (TBS, 2006)
 Yonimo Kimyona Monogatari (Neko ga Ongaeshi) (Fuji TV)
 Kiraware Matsuko no Issho (TBS, 2006) as Kawajiri Matsuko
 Seito Shokun! (TV Asahi, 2007) as Hokujo Shoko
 Kodoku no Utagoe (Wowow, 2007)
 Ten to Sen (TV Asahi, 2007)
 Yagyu Ichizoku no Inbo (TV Asahi, 2008)
 Daibutsu Kaigen (NHK, 2010)
 Brutus no Shinzo (Fuji TV, 2011)
 Toshi Densetsu no Onna (TV Asahi, 2012, ep1)
 |Utamaro's Mashie (TV Asahi, 2012)
 Sosa Chizu no Onna (TV Asahi, 2012)
 Honey Trap (Fuji TV, 2013) as Kaoru Nakagawa
 Joyu Reiko Honoo no Youni (TV Tokyo, 2013) as Reiko Ohara

Awards

References

External links
 

  
at JMDb 
Uchiyama Rina info at jdorama.com

1981 births
Living people
People from Minamiashigara, Kanagawa
Actresses from Kanagawa Prefecture
Japanese television actresses
20th-century Japanese actresses
21st-century Japanese actresses